Macroglossum nycteris, the Himalayan hummingbird hawkmoth, is a moth of the family Sphingidae.

Larvae have been recorded feeding on Galium species and Rubia cordifolia.

References

Macroglossum
Moths described in 1844